Taos Municipal Schools (TMS) or Taos Municipal School District (TMSD) is a school district based in Taos, New Mexico, United States. The school district has a total of six schools. The district has one high school, one middle school, three elementary schools,  and one magnet school.

History
Beginning in 1997 the number of students declined. Due to elderly people making up an increasing percentage of area residents and a post-1999 drop in births in Taos County, in 2022 the district anticipated an upcoming decline in the number of students.

Service area

The district serves serves the communities of Taos, Arroyo Hondo, Arroyo Seco, Ranchos de Taos, San Cristobal, Talpa, Taos Pueblo, and almost all of Taos Ski Valley. It also includes Cañon, Ranchitos, El Prado, Des Montes, Llano Quemado, and Cordillera.

Schools
 Secondary schools
 Taos High School (Taos)
 Taos Middle School (Taos)

Elementary schools
 Arroyos del Norte Elementary School (Unincorporated area)
 Enos Garcia Elementary School (Taos)
 In 2011 it had 602 students. In 2020 this was down to 440.
 Ranchos Elementary School (Ranchos de Taos)
 In 2011 it had 459 students. In 2020 this was down to 279.

Magnet schools
 Taos Cyber Magnet School

References

External links
 Taos Municipal Schools

Education in Taos County, New Mexico
School districts in New Mexico
Schools